The following table indicates declared Bahrain government national holidays for the year 2015 only—cultural variants also provide opportunity for holidays tied to local events.  In total there are 10 public holidays.

2017 public holidays

See also 
 Islamic calendar - for further expansion on the months and days identified above

Notes 
 Second time in 2015 due to lunar cycles

References 
 Public Holidays in Bahrain (2014)

 
Bahrain